Tilt is a collaborative studio album by guitarists Greg Howe and Richie Kotzen, released in 1995 through Shrapnel Records. The collaboration was organized by Shrapnel founder Mike Varney due to his enthusiasm for both guitarists' stylistic similarities, and as a result of good sales a second album, Project, was released in 1997.

Critical reception

Stephen Thomas Erlewine at AllMusic gave Tilt two stars out of five, describing it as being "filled with fretboard heroics in the vein of Eddie Van Halen and Allan Holdsworth", but that it was "nearly half-a-decade behind the times". He criticized the album for lacking any memorable songs and being composed of "nothing but hot-shot guitar playing", while also being critical of the interplay between Howe and Kotzen: "The two guitarists sound like they're fighting each other, not playing."

Track listing

Personnel
Greg Howe – guitar (left stereo channel), keyboard, bass (tracks 1, 3, 5, 7, 9), engineering, mixing, production
Richie Kotzen – guitar (right stereo channel), vocals, clavinet, bass (tracks 2, 4, 6, 8), engineering, mixing, production
Jon Doman – drums (tracks 1, 3, 5, 9)
Atma Anur – drums (tracks 2, 4, 6, 8)
Kevin Soffera – drums (track 7)
Kenneth K. Lee, Jr. – mastering

References

External links
In Review: Kotzen/Howe "Tilt" at Guitar Nine Records

Greg Howe albums
Richie Kotzen albums
1995 albums
Shrapnel Records albums
Collaborative albums
Albums recorded in a home studio